The Battle at Apache Pass is a 1952 American Western film directed by George Sherman. The stars are John Lund as United States Army Maj. Colton and Jeff Chandler  repeating the role of Apache chief Cochise, whom he had played two years earlier in 20th Century Fox's Broken Arrow. Jay Silverheels also reprised his role of Geronimo from the same film.

The film is a highly fictionalized account combining the events of "The Bascom Affair" of 1861 and the "Battle of Apache Pass" of 1862, the first time that Native Americans met modern (for the age) artillery. It was rated as the #1 moneymaker in Variety magazine's list of box-office pictures, when it was released in April 1952.

Plot
In 1862, as the Civil War rages in the Southeastern states, the Southwest is far away from the battle lines, but in New Mexico Territory, good relations between Fort Buchanan's commanding officer, Maj. Colton (John Lund), and Chiricahua Apache chief Cochise (Jeff Chandler) are threatened by the arrival of venal government agent Baylor (Bruce Cowling) and his equally dishonest scout Mescal Jack (Jack Elam).

In breach of existing treaties, Baylor plans to resettle the Apaches to the San Carlos Reservation, and when Geronimo (Jay Silverheels), the chief of the rival Mogollon Apaches, attacks the Tucson stagecoach and kills women and children, Baylor threatens to also transport the Chiricahuas to San Carlos. When confronted by Colton and Baylor, Cochise calls a council of Apache elders and they vote to banish Geronimo, who must also give up one of his stagecoach captives, schoolteacher Mary (Beverly Tyler). After assuring his pregnant wife Nona (Susan Cabot) that his interest in the attractive young schoolteacher is not romantic, Cochise brings Mary to Fort Buchanan and entrusts her to Maj. Colton, counseling him that she would be a fine wife.

At the same time Baylor and Jack plot with Geronimo to frame Cochise for Geronimo's attack on a ranch. During Colton's inquiry into the attack, his subordinate, Lt. Bascom (John Hudson), is promised a promotion by Baylor for rescuing the boy who was kidnapped during the attack. Cochise tells Bascom that it was Geronimo who committed the attack, but Bascom accuses him of lying and takes Nona hostage, while executing by hanging three braves, including Cochise's brother, Little Elk (Tommy Cook). As Cochise mourns and then prepares to retaliate against Bascom's position, Mescal Jack goes to him on the pretense of warning him about an Army attack, but Cochise calls him a liar and puts him to death. Colton's trusted Sgt. Bernard (Richard Egan) informs him of the situation, causing Colton to shut down Fort Buchanan and prepare to transfer everyone, including Mary and Baylor, to Fort Sheridan, a more secure redoubt, some distance away.

From the hills along the trail, Cochise watches the procession, as does Geronimo and, as shooting begins, the wounded Baylor goes towards the Indians' positions, shouting that he is their friend, but Geronimo kills him. Colton and Sgt. Bernard use the expedition's cannon to rout the warriors, as Cochise finds Nona, who has been hurt, and takes her to the wagons so that Army Dr. Carter (Regis Toomey) can treat her. Geronimo calls Cochise a weak leader, but in a one-to-one battle, Cochise wins and, instead of killing Geronimo, banishes him. Nona's son is born and Nona gives her friend Mary a precious Apache bracelet. Colton and Mary look at each other with affection and Cochise tells them that time has come for peace, as he rides away with Nona.

Cast

 John Lund  as Major Jim Colton
 Jeff Chandler as Cochise
 Susan Cabot as Nona
 Bruce Cowling as Neil Baylor
 Beverly Tyler as Mary Kearny
 Richard Egan as Sgt. Reuben Bernard
 Jay Silverheels as Geronimo
 John Hudson as Lt. George Bascom
 Jack Elam as Mescal Jack

 Regis Toomey as Dr. Major Carter
 Tommy Cook as Little Elk
 Hugh O'Brian as Lt. Robert Harley
 James Best as Cpl. Hassett
 Richard Garland as Culver
 Palmer Lee as Joe Bent
 William Reynolds as Lem Bent
 Paul Smith as Trumpeter Cpl. Ross
 Jack Ingram as Johnny Ward

Production
The film was announced in June 1951. Parts of the film were shot in Professor Valley, Ida Gulch, Courthouse Wash, Arches National Park, Colorado River, and Sand Flats in Utah. In Great Britain in the 1950s the film was represented by a multi-page article in The Western Film Annual (edited by F. Maurice Speed) featuring text and photos. Jay Silverheels was given the wrongly spelled name of Jay Silverhills.

Text in opening credits
"All the battle scenes in this production were actually photographed at Arches National Monument Park".

"We gratefully acknowledge the assistance of the National Park Service of the United States Department of the Interior whose splendid cooperation made these scenes possible".

Evaluation in film guides
Leonard Maltin's Movie Guide gives The Battle at Apache Pass 2½ stars (out of 4) indicating that "Chandler reprises his BROKEN ARROW role as Cochise". The Motion Picture Guide assigns it 2 stars (out of 5), describing it as "[n]ot the greatest western ever made, but interesting for its portrayal of Indians as rational human beings able to cooperate with the white man".

References

External links
 
 
 
 
 The Battle at Apache Pass at TV Guide (1987 write-up was originally published in The Motion Picture Guide)
 Review of film at Variety

1952 films
1952 Western (genre) films
American Western (genre) films
Western (genre) cavalry films
Revisionist Western (genre) films
Apache Wars films
Films set in 1862
Films set in Arizona
Films shot in Utah
American historical films
1950s historical films
1950s American films
1950s English-language films
Films directed by George Sherman
Films scored by Hans J. Salter
Universal Pictures films